Klaartje Quirijns (born 1967 in Amsterdam, Netherlands) is a Dutch film and television director and producer. In The Netherlands she worked as a documentary director and producer for the public stations VPRO, IKON and NPS.

Internationally, Quirijns got recognition for her documentaries The Brooklyn Connection (2005), The Dictator Hunter (2007), with Souleymane Guengueng and Peace vs. Justice (2011), a documentary about the Lord's Resistance Army and Anton Corbijn Inside Out (2012). While pursuing independent documentary projects, Quirijns continues to work as a correspondent for Dutch national radio and television.

Early life and career
Quirijns was based in New York City between 1997 and 2007, Quirijns lives with her family in London, United Kingdom. In 2013, Quirijns began to direct fiction films. Her first work was Speelman, a story of a marriage, which premièred at the Dutch Film Festival in the Netherlands.

Filmography

Documentaries
 The Brooklyn Connection (2005) - in this documentary she interviewed Kosovan-born American gun runner Florin Krasniqi, and accompanied him on a purchase of weapons from an Army Surplus store.
 The Dictator Hunter (2007) - Quirijns portrays the American human rights lawyer Reed Brody over the course of three years. Brody is after Chad's former dictator Hissène Habré. The documentary premiered at the Toronto International Film Festival and received nominations for the European Film Awards and won several awards.
 Peace vs Justice (2011) - in this documentary Quirijns visualises the tensions between the International Criminal Court in The Hague, Netherlands and the Lord's Resistance Army 
 Anton Corbijn Inside Out (2012) - Over three years, Quirijns traveled the world with internationally acclaimed pop photographer Anton Corbijn. In this documentary she unveils Corbijns complex being. Sacrificing his private life versus his career, his articicity  versus his large audience and recognition versus loneliness. Anton Corbijn Inside Out premiered at the Berlin International Film Festival.

Movies
 Speelman (2013) - Quirijn's first fiction film. A story of a marriage, which premiered at the Dutch Film Festival in the Netherlands.

In production
The Dictator Hunter, a fiction film based on her documentary (2007 The Dictator Hunter). (produced by Anne Carey written by Michael Bronner (Captain Phillips and Greenzone)
They Fuck You Up, a film, drawing on psychoanalysis, about the roles we play, scripted by our family and how we might break through these patterns by understanding them. (produced by Pieter van Huystee)
Ten White Geese, a full-length fiction film based on a book by Gerbrand Bakker, a Dutch writer that has also received high acclaim internationally, including winner of the Independent Foreign Fiction Prize 2013. (produced by Jeroen Beker and Els Vandervorst)

Awards
The Brooklyn Connection (2005)
 CINE Golden Eagle Trophy, 2005
 The Dictator Hunter (2007)
 Nomination Zilveren Wolf, IDFA, 2007
 Nomination 'best documentary' European Film Awards, 2008
 Best Documentary Courmayeur Noir Film Festival, (Italy) 2007

Anton Corbijn Inside Out (2012)
 Première Berlinale, 2012
 Prix Italia, 2012 in Music and Arts Documentary

References

External links

 Official website

1967 births
Living people
Dutch film directors
Dutch women film directors
Dutch film producers
Dutch women film producers
Dutch television directors
Dutch television presenters
Dutch television producers
Women television producers
Mass media people from Amsterdam
Date of birth missing (living people)
Dutch women television presenters
Dutch women television producers
20th-century Dutch women
20th-century Dutch people